Protein C, also known as autoprothrombin IIA and blood coagulation factor XIX, is a zymogen, that is, an inactive enzyme. The activated form plays an important role in regulating anticoagulation, inflammation, and cell death and maintaining the permeability of blood vessel walls in humans and other animals. Activated protein C (APC) performs these operations primarily by proteolytically inactivating proteins Factor Va and Factor VIIIa. APC is classified as a serine protease since it contains a residue of serine in its active site. In humans, protein C is encoded by the PROC gene, which is found on chromosome 2.

The zymogenic form of protein C is a vitamin K-dependent glycoprotein that circulates in blood plasma. Its structure is that of a two-chain polypeptide consisting of a light chain and a heavy chain connected by a disulfide bond. The protein C zymogen is activated when it binds to thrombin, another protein heavily involved in coagulation, and protein C's activation is greatly promoted by the presence of thrombomodulin and endothelial protein C receptors (EPCRs). Because of EPCR's role, activated protein C is found primarily near endothelial cells (i.e., those that make up the walls of blood vessels), and it is these cells and leukocytes (white blood cells) that APC affects. Because of the crucial role that protein C plays as an anticoagulant, those with deficiencies in protein C, or some kind of resistance to APC, suffer from a significantly increased risk of forming dangerous blood clots (thrombosis).

Research into the clinical use of a recombinant form of human Activated Protein C (rhAPC) known as Drotrecogin alfa-activated, branded Xigris by Eli Lilly and Company, has been surrounded by controversy. Eli Lilly ran an aggressive marketing campaign to promote its use for people with severe sepsis and septic shock and sponsored the 2004 Surviving Sepsis Campaign Guidelines. However, a 2012 Cochrane review found that its use cannot be recommended since it does not improve survival and increases bleeding risk. In October 2011, Xigris was withdrawn from the market by Eli Lilly due to a higher mortality in a trial among adults.

History
Protein C's anticoagulant role in the human body was first noted by Seegers et al. in 1960, who gave protein C its original name, autoprothrombin II-a. Protein C was first isolated by Johan Stenflo from bovine plasma in 1976, and Stenflo determined it to be a vitamin K-dependent protein. He named it protein C because it was the third protein ("peak C") that eluted from a DEAE-Sepharose ion-exchange chromotograph. Seegers was, at the time, searching for vitamin K-dependent coagulation factors undetected by clotting assays, which measure global clotting function. Soon after this, Seegers recognised Stenflo's discovery was identical with his own. Activated protein C was discovered later that year, and in 1977 it was first recognised that APC inactivates Factor Va. In 1980, Vehar and Davie discovered that APC also inactivates Factor VIIIa, and soon after, Protein S was recognised as a cofactor by Walker. In 1982, a family study by Griffin et al. first associated protein C deficiency with symptoms of venous thrombosis. Homozygous protein C deficiency and the consequent serious health effects were described in 1984 by several scientists. cDNA cloning of protein C was first performed in 1984 by Beckmann et al. which produced a map of the gene responsible for producing protein C in the liver. In 1987 a seminal experiment was performed (Taylor et al.) whereby it was demonstrated that activated protein C prevented coagulopathy and death in baboons infused with lethal concentrations of E. coli.

In 1993, a heritable resistance to APC was detected by Dahlbäck et al. and associated with familial thrombophilia.  In 1994, the relatively common genetic mutation that produces Factor VLeiden was noted (Bertina et al.). Two years later, Gla-domainless APC was imaged at a resolution of 2.8 Ångströms.  Beginning with the PROWESS clinical trial of 2001, it was recognised that many of the symptoms of sepsis may be ameliorated by infusion of APC, and mortality rates of septic patients may be significantly decreased. Near the end of that year, Drotrecogin alfa (activated), a recombinant human activated protein C, became the first drug approved by the U.S. FDA  for treating severe sepsis. In 2002, Science published an article that first showed protein C activates protease-activated receptor-1 (PAR-1) and this process accounts for the protein's modulation of the immune system.

Genetics
The biologic instructions for synthesising protein C in humans are encoded in the gene officially named "protein C (inactivator of coagulation factors Va and VIIIa)". The gene's symbol approved by the HUGO Gene Nomenclature Committee is "PROC" from "protein C". It is located on the second chromosome (2q13-q14) and comprises nine exons. The nucleotide sequence that codes for human protein C is approximately 11,000 bases long.

Structure and processing
Human protein C is a vitamin K-dependent glycoprotein structurally similar to other vitamin K-dependent proteins affecting blood clotting, such as prothrombin, Factor VII, Factor IX and Factor X. Protein C synthesis occurs in the liver and begins with a single-chain precursor molecule: a 32 amino acid N-terminus signal peptide preceding a propeptide. Protein C is formed when a dipeptide of Lys198 and Arg199 is removed; this causes the transformation into a heterodimer with N-linked carbohydrates on each chain. The protein has one light chain (21 kDa) and one heavy chain (41 kDa) connected by a disulfide bond between Cys183 and Cys319.

Inactive protein C comprises 419 amino acids in multiple domains: one Gla domain (residues 43–88); a helical aromatic segment (89–96); two epidermal growth factor (EGF)-like domains (97–132 and 136–176); an activation peptide (200–211); and a trypsin-like serine protease domain (212–450). The light chain contains the Gla- and EGF-like domains and the aromatic segment. The heavy chain contains the protease domain and the activation petide. It is in this form that 85–90% of protein C circulates in the plasma as a zymogen, waiting to be activated. The remaining protein C zymogen comprises slightly modified forms of the protein. Activation of the enzyme occurs when a thrombin molecule cleaves away the activation peptide from the N-terminus of the heavy chain.
 The active site contains a catalytic triad typical of serine proteases (His253, Asp299 and Ser402).

The Gla domain is particularly useful for binding to negatively charged phospholipids for anticoagulation and to EPCR for cytoprotection. One particular exosite augments protein C's ability to inactivate Factor Va efficiently. Another is necessary for interacting with thrombomodulin.

Post-translational modifications. Human Protein C has at least five types of post-translational modifications: (1) gamma-carboxylation on the first nine glutamic acid residues in the protein sequence. This modification event is performed by a vitamin K-dependent microsomal carboxylase. The full complement of Gla is required to give full activity to protein C. (2) beta-Hydroxylation of Asp71 in one of the two EGF-like domains to give erythro-L-beta-hydroxy-aspartate (bHA). The modification is required for functional activity as was demonstrated by mutating Asp71 to Glu. (3) N-linked glycosylation at three possible glycosylation sites. Plasma human Protein C has been reported to be 23% carbohydrate by weight. (4) Disulfide formation. (5) Multiple proteolytic cleavages of the polypeptide backbone to remove an 18 amino acid signal peptide, a 24 amino acid propeptide and then cleavages at amino acids 155-156 and 157-158 to yield the two-chain structure of the circulating zymogen.

Physiology
The activation of protein C is strongly promoted by thrombomodulin and endothelial protein C receptor (EPCR), the latter of which is found primarily on endothelial cells (cells on the inside of blood vessels). The presence of thrombomodulin accelerates activation by several orders of magnitude, and EPCR speeds up activation by a factor of 20. If either of these two proteins is absent in murine specimens, the mouse dies from excessive blood-clotting while still in an embryonic state. On the endothelium, APC performs a major role in regulating blood clotting, inflammation, and cell death (apoptosis). Because of the accelerating effect of thrombomodulin on the activation of protein C, the protein may be said to be activated not by thrombin but the thrombin–thrombomodulin (or even thrombin–thrombomodulin–EPCR) complex. Once in active form, APC may or may not remain bound to EPCR, to which it has approximately the same affinity as the protein zymogen.

Protein C in zymogen form is present in normal adult human blood plasma at concentrations between 65 and 135 IU/dL. Activated protein C is found at levels approximately 2000 times lower than this.  Mild protein C deficiency corresponds to plasma levels above 20 IU/dL, but below the normal range. Moderately severe deficiencies describe blood concentrations between 1 and 20 IU/dL; severe deficiencies yield levels of protein C that are below 1 IU/dL or are undetectable. Protein C levels in a healthy term infant average 40 IU/dL. The concentration of protein C increases until six months, when the mean level is 60 IU/dL; the level stays low through childhood until it reaches adult levels after adolescence. The half-life of activated protein C is around 15 minutes.

Pathways
The protein C pathways are the specific chemical reactions that control the level of expression of APC and its activity in the body. Protein C is pleiotropic, with two main classes of functions: anticoagulation and cytoprotection (its direct effect on cells). Which function protein C performs depends on whether or not APC remains bound to EPCR after it is activated; the anticoagulative effects of APC occur when it does not. In this case, protein C functions as an anticoagulant by irreversibly proteolytically inactivating Factor Va and Factor VIIIa, turning them into Factor Vi and Factor VIIIi respectively. When still bound to EPCR, activated protein C performs its cytoprotective effects, acting on the effector substrate PAR-1, protease-activated receptor-1. To a degree, APC's anticoagulant properties are independent of its cytoprotective ones, in that expression of one pathway is not affected by the existence of the other.

The activity of protein C may be down-regulated by reducing the amount either of available thrombomodulin or of EPCR. This may be done by inflammatory cytokines, such as interleukin-1β  (IL-1β ) and tumor necrosis factor-α (TNF-α). Activated leukocytes release these inflammatory mediators during inflammation, inhibiting the creation of both thrombomodulin and EPCR, and inducing their shedding from the endothelial surface. Both of these actions down-regulate protein C activation. Thrombin itself may also have an effect on the levels of EPCR. In addition, proteins released from cells can impede protein C activation, for example eosinophil, which may explain thrombosis in hypereosinophilic heart disease. Protein C may be up-regulated by platelet factor 4. This cytokine is conjectured to improve activation of protein C by forming an electrostatic bridge from protein C's Gla domain to the glycosaminoglycan (GAG) domain of thrombomodulin, reducing the Michaelis constant (KM) for their reaction. In addition, Protein C is inhibited by protein C inhibitor.

Anticoagulative effects

Protein C is a major component in anticoagulation in the human body. It acts as a serine protease zymogen: APC proteolyses peptide bonds in activated Factor V and Factor VIII (Factor Va and Factor VIIIa), and one of the amino acids in the bond is serine. These proteins that APC inactivates, Factor Va and Factor VIIIa, are highly procoagulant cofactors in the generation of thrombin, which is a crucial element in blood clotting; together they are part of the prothrombinase complex. Cofactors in the inactivation of Factor Va and Factor VIIIa include protein S, Factor V, high-density lipoprotein, anionic phospholipids and glycosphingolipids.

Factor Va binds to prothrombin and Factor Xa, increasing the rate at which thrombin is produced by four orders of magnitude (10,000x). Inactivation of Factor Va thus practically halts the production of thrombin. Factor VIII, on the other hand, is a cofactor in production of activated Factor X, which in turn converts prothrombin into thrombin. Factor VIIIa augments Factor X activation by a factor of around 200,000. Because of its importance in clotting, Factor VIII is also known as anti-haemophilic factor, and deficiencies of Factor VIII cause haemophilia A.

APC inactivates Factor Va by making three cleavages (Arg306, Arg506, Arg679). The cleavages at both Arg306 and Arg506 diminish the molecule's attraction to Factor Xa, and though the first of these sites is slow to be cleaved, it is entirely necessary to the functioning of Factor V. Protein S aids this process by catalysing the proteolysis at Arg306, in which the A2 domain of Factor V is dissociated from the rest of the protein. Protein S also binds to Factor Xa, inhibiting the latter from diminishing APC's inactivation of Factor Va.

The inactivation of Factor VIIIa is not as well understood. The half-life of Factor VIIIa is only around two minutes unless Factor IXa is present to stabilise it. Some have questioned the significance of APC's inactivation of Factor VIIIa, and it is unknown to what degree Factor V and protein S are cofactors in its proteolysis. It is known that APC works on Factor VIIIa by cleaving at two sites, Arg336 and Arg562, either of which is sufficient to disable Factor VIIIa and convert it to Factor VIIIi.

Cytoprotective effects
When APC is bound to EPCR, it performs a number of important cytoprotective (i.e. cell-protecting) functions, most of which are known to require EPCR and PAR-1. These include regulating gene expression, anti-inflammatory effects, antiapoptotic effects and protecting endothelial barrier function.

Treatment of cells with APC demonstrates that its gene expression modulation effectively controls major pathways for inflammatory and apoptotic behaviour. There are about 20 genes that are up-regulated by protein C, and 20 genes that are down-regulated: the former are generally anti-inflammatory and antiapoptotic pathways, while the latter tend to be proinflammatory and proapoptotic. APC's mechanisms for altering gene expression profiles are not well understood, but it is believed that they at least partly involve an inhibitory effect on transcription factor activity. Important proteins that APC up-regulates include Bcl-2, eNOS and IAP. APC effects significant down-regulation of p53 and Bax.

APC has anti-inflammatory effects on endothelial cells and leukocytes. APC affects endothelial cells by inhibiting inflammatory mediator release and down-regulating vascular adhesion molecules. This reduces leukocyte adhesion and infiltration into tissues, while also limiting damage to underlying tissue. APC supports endothelial barrier function and reduces chemotaxis. APC inhibits the release of inflammatory-response mediators in leukocytes as well as endothelial cells, by reducing cytokine response, and maybe diminishing systemic inflammatory response, such as is seen in sepsis. Studies on both rats and humans have demonstrated that APC reduces endotoxin-induced pulmonary injury and inflammation.

Scientists recognise activated protein C's antiapoptotic effects, but are unclear as to the exact mechanisms by which apoptosis is inhibited. It is known that APC is neuroprotective. Antiapoptosis is achieved with diminished activation of caspase 3 and caspase 8, improved Bax/Bcl-2 ratio and down-regulation of p53.

Activated protein C also provides much protection of endothelial barrier function. Endothelial barrier breakdown, and the corresponding increase in endothelial permeability, are associated with swelling, hypotension and inflammation, all problems of sepsis. APC protects endothelial barrier function by inducing PAR-1 dependent sphingosine kinase-1 activation and up-regulating sphingosine-1-phosphate with sphingosine kinase.

Several studies have indicated that the proteolytic activity of APC contributes to the observed cytoprotective properties of APC, but variants that are proteolytically inactive also are able to regulate formation of PAR-activators thrombin and factor Xa and express cytoprotective properties in vitro and in vivo.

Role in disease
A genetic protein C deficiency, in its mild form associated with simple heterozygosity, causes a significantly increased risk of venous thrombosis in adults. If a fetus is homozygous or compound heterozygous for the deficiency, there may be a presentation of purpura fulminans, severe disseminated intravascular coagulation and simultaneous venous thromboembolism in the womb;  this is very severe and usually fatal. Deletion of the protein C gene in mice causes fetal death around the time of birth. Fetal mice with no protein C develop normally at first, but experience severe bleeding, coagulopathy, deposition of fibrin and necrosis of the liver.

The frequency of protein C deficiency among asymptomatic individuals is between 1 in 200 and 1 in 500. In contrast, significant symptoms of the deficiency are detectable in 1 in 20,000 individuals. No racial nor ethnic biases have been detected.

At least 177 disease-causing mutations in this gene have been discovered. Activated protein C resistance occurs when APC is unable to perform its functions. This disease has similar symptoms to protein C deficiency. The most common mutation leading to activated protein C resistance among Caucasians is at the cleavage site in Factor V for APC. There, Arg506 is replaced with Gln, producing Factor V Leiden. This mutation is also called a R506Q. The mutation leading to the loss of this cleavage site actually stops APC from effectively inactivating both Factor Va and Factor VIIIa. Thus, the person's blood clots too readily, and he is perpetually at an increased risk for thrombosis. Individuals heterozygous for the Factor VLeiden mutation carry a risk of venous thrombosis 5–7 times higher than in the general population. Homozygous subjects have a risk 80 times higher. This mutation is also the most common hereditary risk for venous thrombosis among Caucasians.

Around 5% of APC resistance are not associated with the above mutation and Factor VLeiden. Other genetic mutations cause APC resistance, but none to the extent that Factor VLeiden does. These mutations include various other versions of Factor V, spontaneous generation of autoantibodies targeting Factor V, and dysfunction of any of APC's cofactors. Also, some acquired conditions may reduce the efficacy of APC in performing its anticoagulative functions. Studies suggest that between 20% and 60% of thrombophilic patients suffer from some form of APC resistance.

Warfarin necrosis is an acquired protein C deficiency due to treatment with warfarin, which is a vitamin K antagonist and an anticoagulant itself. However, warfarin treatment may produce paradoxical skin lesions similar to those seen in purpura fulminans. A variant of this response presents as venous limb gangrene when warfarin is used to treat deep vein thrombosis associated with cancer. In these situations, warfarin may be restarted at a low dosage to ensure that the protein C deficiency does not present before the vitamin K coagulation factors II, IX and X are suppressed.

Activated protein C cleaves Plasmodium falciparum histones which are released during infection: cleavage of these histones eliminates their pro inflammatory effects.

Role in medicine

In November 2001, the Food and Drug Administration approved Drotrecogin alfa-activated (DrotAA) for the clinical treatment of adults suffering from severe sepsis and with a high risk of death. Drotrecogin alfa-activated is a recombinant form of human activated protein C (rhAPC). It is marketed as Xigris by Eli Lilly and Company,

Drotrecogin alfa-activated was the subject of significant controversy while it was approved for clinical use as it was found to increase bleeding and not to reduce mortality. In October 2011 rhAPC (Xigris) was withdrawn from the market by Eli Lilly due to a higher mortality in a trial among adults.

APC has been studied as way of treating lung injury, after studies showed that in patients with lung injury, reduced APC levels in specific parts of the lungs correlated with worse outcomes. APC also has been considered for use in improving patient outcome in cases of ischemic stroke, a medical emergency in which arterial blockage deprives a region of brain of oxygen, causing tissue death. Promising studies suggest that APC could be coupled with the only currently approved treatment, tissue plasminogen activator (tPA), to protect the brain from tPA's very harmful side effects, in addition to preventing cell death from lack of oxygen (hypoxia). Clinical use of APC has also been proposed for improving the outcome of pancreatic islet transplantation in treating type I diabetes.

Ceprotin was approved for medical used in the European Union in July 2001. Ceprotin is indicated in purpura fulminans and coumarin-induced skin necrosis in people with severe congenital protein C deficiency.

See also
 Activated protein C–protein C inhibitor

Notes

References

External links 
 The MEROPS online database for peptidases and their inhibitors: S01.218
 

Coagulation system
Peripheral membrane proteins
EC 3.4.21
Angiology
Hematology
Zymogens